Hans Kuhnert (4 January 1901 – 29 July 1974) was a German actor, art director and production designer. Kuhnert began his career as an actor during the silent era. He played the lead alongside Olga Tschechowa in Violet. From the mid-1930s Kuhnert switched to working on the visual design of film sets. He worked frequently at this into the 1960s. He was sometimes credited as Hanns H. Kuhnert.

Selected filmography

Actor
 The Feast of Rosella (1919)
 The Peruvian (1919)
 Intrigue (1920)
 Violet (1921)
 Der falsche Prinz (1922)
 Tragedy of Love (1923)
 Dreiklang der Nacht (1924)
 The Third Watch (1924)

Art Director
 Holiday From Myself (1934)
 The Monastery's Hunter (1935)
 The Saint and Her Fool (1935)
 Frau Sixta (1938)
 Storms in May (1938)
 The Rothschilds (1940)
 Left of the Isar, Right of the Spree (1940)
 The Lost Face (1948)
 Man on a Tightrope (1953)
 Salto Mortale (1953)
 Night People (1954)
 Carnival Story (1954)
 Circus of Love (1954)
 Ten on Every Finger (1954)
 Love Is Just a Fairytale (1955)
 Yes, Yes, Love in Tyrol (1955)
 Spy for Germany (1956)
 Black Forest Melody (1956)
 The Fox of Paris (1957)
 Two Hearts in May (1958)
 World in My Pocket (1961)
 You Must Be Blonde on Capri (1961)
 Scotland Yard Hunts Dr. Mabuse (1963)

Production Designer
 The Hunter of Fall (1936)
 Lache Bajazzo (1943)
 Spy for Germany (1956)
 Peter Voss, Thief of Millions (1958)

References

Bibliography
 Hardt, Ursula. From Caligari to California: Erich Pommer's life in the International Film Wars. Berghahn Books, 1996.

External links

1901 births
1974 deaths
German male silent film actors
German art directors
German production designers
Male actors from Berlin
20th-century German male actors
Film people from Berlin